

See also 
 United States House of Representatives elections, 1790 and 1791
 List of United States representatives from New Hampshire

New Hampshire
1790
United States House of Representatives